Nokes v Doncaster Amalgamated Collieries Ltd [1940] AC 1014 is a UK labour law case about the common law before the Transfers of Undertakings Directive 2001 and the Transfer of Undertakings (Protection of Employment) Regulations 2006. The case decided that an employee had to consent before a burden was placed on him by a change in employer.

Facts
Mr Nokes had worked for the Hickleton Main Co Ltd until 4 June 1937, when the Chancery Court gave an order for the business to be transferred under the Companies Act 1929, section 154(1), on arrangements and reconstructions to Doncaster Amalgamated Collieries Ltd. Mr Nokes was absent and would be liable to pay damages to the new business under the Employers and Workmen Act 1875, section 4, if he had a service contract with the company, which he denied. However, the Divisional Court and the Court of Appeal ordered him to pay 15s (approx. £50 today) in damages and 10s (approx. £33 today) in costs. He appealed to the House of Lords.

Judgment
The House of Lords held, by a majority, that Mr Nokes did not have to pay the fee because his employment could not be transferred without his consent. Viscount Simon LC said that it is 'a fundamental principle of our common law... that a free citizen, in the exercise of his freedom, is entitled to choose the employer whom he promises to serve, so that the right to his services cannot be transferred from one employer to another without his assent'. Lord Atkin vigorously denied that Employers and Workmen Act 1875 could result in a fine for the worker and went so far as to say that he regarded any automatic transfer rule would be 'tainted with oppression and confiscation'. He wrote the following.

Lord Thankerton and Lord Porter concurred.

Lord Romer dissented.

See also

UK labour law

Notes

United Kingdom labour case law
House of Lords cases
1940 in case law
1940 in British law